Swett  is the surname of:
 Benjamin Swett, American photographer and writer
 Emelie Tracy Y. Swett (1863–1892), American poet, author, editor
 James E. Swett (1920–2009), US Marine Corps World War II fighter ace and Medal of Honor recipient
 John Swett (1830–1913), founder of the California public school system
John Swett High School in Crockett, California, U.S.
John Swett Unified School District
Jorge Swett (1926–2012), Ecuadorian muralist, painter, lawyer and writer
 Katrina Swett (born 1955), consultant
 Leonard Swett (1825–1889), American lawyer who advised President Lincoln
 María Elena Swett (born 1979), Chilean actress
 Pop Swett (1870–1934), baseball player
 Richard Swett (born 1957), American politician